Green Township is a township in Indiana County, Pennsylvania, United States. Green Township was formed from Wheatfield Township circa 1816 and was named for the great evergreen forests covering the area. The population was 3,457 at the 2020 census. The township includes the communities of Bencetown, Berringer (previously called Kesslerville), Commodore, Cookport, Cush Cushion, Dixonville, Fleming Summit, Grisemore, Leard, Lovejoy, Martintown, Pine Flats, Prosperity Hill, Purchase Line, Shanktown, Starford, Spruce, Utah (previously Taylorsville), Uniontown, and Wandin.

History
The Commodore Historic District was listed on the National Register of Historic Places in 1994.

Geography

Demographics

As of the census of 2000, there were 3,995 people, 1,431 households, and 1,153 families residing in the township.  The population density was 75.7 people per square mile (29.2/km2).  There were 1,577 housing units at an average density of 29.9/sq mi (11.5/km2).  The racial makeup of the township was 98.85% White, 0.18% African American, 0.10% from other races, and 0.88% from two or more races. Hispanic or Latino of any race were 0.53% of the population.

There were 1,431 households, out of which 34.2% had children under the age of 18 living with them, 66.2% were married couples living together, 9.7% had a female householder with no husband present, and 19.4% were non-families. 17.1% of all households were made up of individuals, and 9.9% had someone living alone who was 65 years of age or older.  The average household size was 2.76 and the average family size was 3.09.

In the township the population was spread out, with 25.1% under the age of 18, 8.7% from 18 to 24, 27.2% from 25 to 44, 24.5% from 45 to 64, and 14.5% who were 65 years of age or older.  The median age was 38 years. For every 100 females there were 99.2 males.  For every 100 females age 18 and over, there were 96.4 males.

The median income for a household in the township was $28,750, and the median income for a family was $32,338. Males had a median income of $25,813 versus $16,949 for females. The per capita income for the township was $12,524.  About 10.0% of families and 14.1% of the population were below the poverty line, including 15.1% of those under age 18 and 14.5% of those age 65 or over.

References

Townships in Indiana County, Pennsylvania
Townships in Pennsylvania